The Austudy Five was the epithet given to a group of five activists arrested in 1992 at a National Union of Students (NUS) national demonstration in Melbourne, Australia. NUS had called the demonstration around the Keating Government's proposed abolition of Austudy as a student grant to be replaced by a student loan. There were reportedly
around 3,000 protesters who broke through police lines advancing on the steps of the Victorian Parliament. Demonstrators surrounded a police van after some demonstrators had been arrested, forcing the Victoria Police to release them. Three weeks later, police arrested the five activists in dawn raids, who were at the time, all from the International Socialist Organisation (ISO). They were charged with unlawful assembly, obstruction and illegal rescue; by where they would be held responsible for the actions of the entire demonstration. The Labor Left President of NUS at the time unsuccessfully moved to have the ISO expelled from NUS. Political activist Tim Anderson described the case as "the most important political frame-up of the decade". The case and campaign to defend the five continued for two years before it was finally dismissed in 1994.

The Austudy Five arrestees
 Jill Sparrow
 Jeff Sparrow
 Jonathon Sherlock
 Marcus Banks
 Mick Armstrong

References 

Activists from Melbourne
Australian Trotskyists